Alfred Hubert West (6 May 1893 – 7 January 1934) was a New Zealand international rugby union forward who played club rugby for Hawera and was capped twice for New Zealand.

Bibliography

References

External links 
 

1893 births
1934 deaths
New Zealand international rugby union players
New Zealand rugby union players
Rugby union forwards
People from Inglewood, New Zealand
Rugby union players from Taranaki